Kanoshoia is an extinct genus of megacheiran arthropod from the mid Cambrian Wheeler Formation of western Utah, containing the species Kanoshoia rectifrons  It was placed in the family Leanchoiliidae.

References

Megacheira
Cambrian arthropods
Prehistoric arthropod genera
Fossil taxa described in 2020